Tihomir Jarnjević (born 2 March 1978) is a Croatian rower. He competed in the men's double sculls event at the 2000 Summer Olympics.

References

1978 births
Living people
Croatian male rowers
Olympic rowers of Croatia
Rowers at the 2000 Summer Olympics
Sportspeople from Karlovac